Fairbanks International Airport  is a state-owned public-use airport located three miles (5 km) southwest of the central business district of Fairbanks, a city in the Fairbanks North Star Borough of the United States state of Alaska. Fairbanks is the smallest city in the United States with regularly scheduled non-stop international flights, as Condor offers weekly flights to Frankfurt during the summer tourist season. Air North is another international airline with flights (to Canada).

History

Early years
The airport opened in 1951 and took over existing scheduled airline traffic to Fairbanks, which had previously used Ladd Army Airfield. Alaska Airlines used Fairbanks as its main hub in the 1950s, with service to Seattle and Portland as well as intrastate service to Anchorage, Nome and other destinations. By 1967, however, the airline shifted its Alaska hub to Anchorage; its Anchorage-Fairbanks service continues to this day. In the mid-1970s, following the development of the Trans-Alaska Pipeline, Alaska Airlines and Braniff International offered "interchange service" between Fairbanks and Houston via Anchorage, Seattle and Dallas. In 1982, following airline deregulation, Alaska Airlines and American Airlines began a similar interchange service using Boeing 727s.

Pan American World Airways had also served Fairbanks since 1932. The station was originally opened after the acquisition of Pacific International Airways and used for short-haul services to Juneau, Seattle, Ketchikan, Whitehorse and other destinations. Pan Am intended to use Fairbanks as a stop for service to Asia as early as 1931, but initial difficulty in negotiating landing rights with the Soviet Union, followed by the outbreak of World War II, delayed these plans until decades later. Pan Am service to Fairbanks continued through the opening of FAI until 1965, when the Civil Aeronautics Board terminated Pan Am's rights to serve Alaska.

Pan American World Airways eventually used Fairbanks as a stopover for transpacific service from New York and Seattle to Tokyo starting in September 1969. In 1974, Pan Am agreed to transfer its Fairbanks-Seattle service to Western Airlines, and requested that the CAB allow its New York-Tokyo service to be suspended from April 1975. Other carriers such as Japan Airlines and Korean Air began to use Fairbanks as a technical stop for transpacific cargo flights in the late 1970s.

Development since the 2000s
On October 11, 2009, the airport completed a new terminal and began demolishing the old terminal which was built in 1948. The new terminal is built around the modern TSA standards. In addition to architectural design and better security, the main terminal now has six jet-bridges (up from the former five). The 2,700m2 of custom-unitized curtain wall was designed and supplied by Overgaard Ltd. Hong Kong. The special design incorporates double low-e triple glazing. The new building's footprint is smaller than the old building.

For the 12-month period ending February 28, 2018, the airport had 119,898 aircraft operations, an average of 328 per day: 58% general aviation, 31% air taxi, 9% scheduled commercial, and 2% military. At that time there were 569 aircraft based at this airport: 91% single-engine, 8% multi-engine, <1% jet and <1% helicopter.

Facilities

Terminal
The terminal building, situated on the northwest side of the airport, contains seven gates: two for commuter carriers and five for larger carriers.

Runways
Fairbanks International Airport covers an area of 3,470 acres (1,404 ha) at an elevation of 439 feet (134 m) above mean sea level. It has four runways:
 Runway 2L/20R: 11,800 by 150 feet (3,597 x 46 m), surface: asphalt
 Runway 2R/20L: 4,501 by 75 feet (1,981 x 30 m), surface: asphalt
 Runway 2/20: 2,900 by 75 feet (884 x 23 m), surface: gravel/ski strip
 Runway 2W/20W: 5,400 by 100 feet (1,646 x 30 m), surface: water/winter ski strip

Airlines and destinations

Passenger

Cargo

Statistics

Accidents and incidents
 On December 30, 1951, Transocean Air Lines Flight 501, a Curtiss C-46 Commando, a cargo flight, crashed on approach to FAI due to not following radio procedures and spatial disorientation. All four occupants were killed. The wreckage was found on January 3, 1952.
 On February 16, 1975, a Pacific Alaska Airlines DC-6, a cargo flight, crashed attempting to return to Fairbanks Int'l Airport. Three engines lost power after takeoff from runway 10 and crashed 2 km short of runway 19 attempting to return to the airport possibly due to fuel contamination. All three occupants were killed.
 On February 28, 1994, during takeoff for a ferry flight to Miami, a Lockheed L-1011-1 Tristar of Rich International Airways (registered N303EA) experienced a mechanical power loss on the number 3 and number 1 engines and an internal fire on the number 1 engine. The takeoff was aborted and during the taxi back, the fire on the number 1 engine was extinguished. None of the 3 occupants on board were injured.

References

External links

 Fairbanks International Airport (official web site)
 FAI Terminal Area Development Project
 FAA Alaska airport map (GIF)
 FAA Alaska airport diagram (GIF)
 
 

 

1951 establishments in Alaska
Airports established in 1951
Airports in Fairbanks North Star Borough, Alaska
Economy of Fairbanks, Alaska
Tourist attractions in Fairbanks North Star Borough, Alaska
WAAS reference stations